Mushy may refer to:

Tony Buckley (born 1980), Irish rugby union player nicknamed "Mushy"
Mushy Callahan (1904–1986), ring name of American light welterweight champion boxer Vincent Morris Scheer
Mushtaq Ahmed (cricketer), Pakistani cricketer and cricket coach

See also
 Mushy peas,  a thick green lumpy soup of prepared marrowfat peas
 Mushie, a town and territory in the Democratic Republic of the Congo